Jeanette Anne Kessler (4 October 1908 – 18 March 1972) was a British alpine skier who competed in the 1936 Winter Olympics. In 1936 she finished eighth in the alpine skiing combined event. She married James Riddell in 1959.

References
Alpine skiing 1936  
Jeanette Kessler's profile at Sports Reference.com

1908 births
1972 deaths
British female alpine skiers
Olympic alpine skiers of Great Britain
Alpine skiers at the 1936 Winter Olympics